Vincent Fondeviole (born 17 February 1965 in Saint-Sever) is a French slalom canoeist who competed in the 1990s. He won two silver medals in the K1 team event at the ICF Canoe Slalom World Championships, earning them in 1993 and 1997.

Fondeviole also finished 14th in the K1 event at the 1992 Summer Olympics in Barcelona.

World Cup individual podiums

References

Sports-reference.com profile

1965 births
Canoeists at the 1992 Summer Olympics
French male canoeists
Living people
Olympic canoeists of France
Medalists at the ICF Canoe Slalom World Championships